The 2004 Historic Grand Prix of Monaco was the fourth running of the Historic Grand Prix of Monaco, a motor racing event for heritage Grand Prix, Voiturettes, Formula One, Formula Two and Sports cars.

Report 
The event featured former Formula One drivers Phil Hill, Stirling Moss and Roberto Mieres.

Festivities included the official opening of a new pit complex.

In Race B, Philip Walker started from the back of the grid due to mechanical issues in practice. He put on a strong recovery drive to finish sixth.

Results

Summary

Série A: Pre 1947 Grand Prix Cars

Série B: Front Engine Grand Prix Cars (1947 - 1960)

Série C: Pre 1953 Sports Cars

Série D: Formula Junior - Front engine

Série E: Rear Engined Grand Prix Cars (1954-1965)

Série F: Formula 1 Grand Prix Cars (1966 - 1976)

References 

Historic motorsport events
Monaco Grand Prix
Historic Grand Prix of Monaco
Historic Grand Prix of Monaco